Gambhiraopet is a village in Gambhiraopet mandal of Rajanna Sircilla district And  territory district KARIMNAGAR in the state of Telangana in India. and there are 18 villages under gambhiraopet mandal and mixed religious people live there i.e. Hindu, Muslim, Christians and it has to be taluka before but it has remains as mandal and

Geography

References

NOTABLE PEOPLE 
PEOPLE FROM THE DISTRICT OF KARIMNAGAR TERRITORY

P. V. Narasimha Rao  Former Prime Minister of India[9]

Vidyasagar Rao, Honourable Maharashtra Governor

Dr. C. Narayana Reddy, writer, Jnanpith Award recipient.
Justice 
N. Kumarayya, Retired Chief Justice of Andhra Pradesh & ex-judge, World Bank Administrative Tribunal

Midde Ramulu (Oggu Katha artist from Hanmajipet village)

Anabheri Prabhakar Rao, Freedom Fighter and Telangana Rebellion Martyr

Mallojula Koteswara Rao

G. Ram Reddy, architect of distance education and the father of open learning in India.

Paidi Jairaj, film actor, director and producer. He was recipient of Dadasaheb Phalke Award for lifetime achievement in 1980.

Siva Reddy, popular Telugu language comedian and actor.

Naveen Deshaboina, Indian film director born in Manakondur
Villages in Rajanna Sircilla district